The 2020 MFF  Charity Cup (also known as the 2020 MPT Charity Cup for sponsorship reasons) is the 9th Charity Cup, an annual football match played between the winners of the previous National League and Domestic Cup competitions.  It was held at YUSC Stadium on 5 January 2020. The match was played between Shan United, champions of the 2019 Myanmar National League and Yangon United, champions of the 2019 General Aung San Shield.

This was Yangon United's 6th Cup appearance and Shan United's 4th time Cup appearance, they won Charity Cup for the first time as Kanbawza FC in 2016.

Match

Team selection

Details

Statistics

References

MFF Charity Cup
2020 in Burmese football